Marvin Wayne Edwards (born August 15, 1935) is a Canadian retired ice hockey goaltender. He played 61 games in the National Hockey League with the Pittsburgh Penguins, Toronto Maple Leafs, and California Golden Seals between 1969 and 1974. The rest of his career, which lasted from 1955 to 1974, was spent in various minor leagues. Internationally Edwards played for Canada at the 1959 World Championships, winning a gold medal.

Playing career
 Edwards started his National Hockey League career with the Pittsburgh Penguins in 1968 after playing for several seasons with the Nashville Dixie Flyers of the Eastern Hockey League, where in his best season he led that circuit with 15 shutouts. He also later played wi season]].

Career statistics

Regular season and playoffs

International

External links
 

1935 births
Amarillo Wranglers players
Baltimore Clippers players
Buffalo Bisons (AHL) players
Calgary Stampeders (WHL) players
California Golden Seals players
Canadian expatriate ice hockey players in the United States
Canadian ice hockey coaches
Canadian ice hockey goaltenders
Ice hockey people from Ontario
Johnstown Jets players
Living people
Milwaukee Falcons players
Ontario Hockey League coaches
Phoenix Roadrunners (WHL) players
Pittsburgh Penguins players
Portland Buckaroos players
St. Catharines Teepees players
Sportspeople from St. Catharines
Toronto Maple Leafs players
Windsor Bulldogs (OHA) players